Lactarius resimus is a species of mushrooms in the genus Lactarius, which is considered a delicacy in Russia and some other countries of Eastern Europe when pickled in salt. There it is considered one of three tastiest edible mushrooms, along with Boletus edulis and Lactarius deliciosus, though it is not held in high esteem elsewhere. The mushroom forms a mycorrhizal relationship with birch and with conifers too (pine).

The cap ranges from 4 to 15 cm in diameter. The stalk ranges from 2 to 6 cm in length and 1 to 3 cm in width. The mushroom is generally white, but stains yellow to orange. The spores are white-yellow, elliptical and bumpy.

Similar species include Lactarius pubescens var. betulae and Lactarius torminosus.

See also
List of Lactarius species

References

Fungi described in 1821
resimus
Russian cuisine
Edible fungi
Fungi of Europe
Taxa named by Elias Magnus Fries